The Hawaiian schooner Waialeale (pronounced Wye-Ally-Ally) operated in the early 1900s as part of the Puget Sound Mosquito Fleet.  She was known colloquially as "Weary Willy".

Construction & Operations
Waialeale was built in 1884 by the Hall Brothers at Port Blakely.  In 1905 the vessel was brought to Puget Sound by Cary Cook of Cook & Company and operated as a propeller steamer on the Tacoma-Vancouver run, replacing the Mainlander. In 1907 she was taken over by the Puget Sound Navigation Company.  She was dismantled in Seattle in 1927.

References 

Steamboats of Washington (state)
Propeller-driven steamboats of Washington (state)
Ships built in Washington (state)
1884 ships